The Ultra-Efficient Products Invader is an American ultralight aircraft that was designed by Nick Leighty and Rick Berstling, produced by Ultra-Efficient Products and introduced in 1982.

Design and development
It features a cantilever mid-wing, pod-and-boom layout, a V-tail, a single-seat, open cockpit, tricycle landing gear and a single engine in pusher configuration.

The aircraft has unusual construction. The fuselage pod is made from gas tungsten arc welded aluminum tubing and composite, attached to a partially double-sleeved aluminum irrigation pipe. Its  span wing is constructed from wood, with foam ribs and one third span ailerons. The V-tail is all-flying and is made from foam ribs glued to the aluminum tubular spar. The flying surfaces are covered in either Mylar or doped aircraft fabric covering. On early models the control system is two-axis, all controlled by the control stick, while later ones incorporate rudder pedals.

The very aerodynamically clean design produces a glide ratio of 14:1.

Operational history
In operational service the aircraft proved to have problems with the ribs deteriorating and separating from the spar after only four years, even when the aircraft was stored indoors. This problem has affected used aircraft prices, as most surviving examples require repairs.

Variants
Invader Mk II
Conventional landing gear model.
Invader Mk III
Tricycle landing gear model.

Specifications (Invader Mk III)

References

External links
Photo of an Invader Mk III

1980s United States ultralight aircraft
Homebuilt aircraft
Single-engined pusher aircraft